The CBT Technology Institute (formerly the College of Business & Technology and also known as CBT) is a private for-profit college based in Miami, Florida. CBT operates three campus locations throughout Miami Dade County and one corporate office located in Cutler Bay, Florida

CBT Technology Institute is accredited by the Accrediting Council for Independent Colleges and Schools to award bachelor's degrees, associate degrees, and diplomas. It is also licensed by the Commission for Independent Education. CBT Technology Institute Cutler Bay Campus is accredited for the Health Information Management Program by the Commission on Accreditation of Health Informatics and Information Management Education (CAHIIM).

History
The College of Business and Technology was founded in 1988 by Fernando Llerena and Gladys Llerena, as the Business and Technology Institute. The institution in February 2001 changed its name to the College of Business and Technology. In 2002 CBT Technology Institute began offering associate degree programs and changed accreditation to the Accrediting Council for Independent Colleges and Schools (ACICS) to pursue higher education degrees. Three years later, the institution expanded by opening new two locations, one in Miami (Flagler) and the other in Hialeah. The Cutler Bay location was added in 2008 followed in 2010. In October 2011, CBT was accredited to offer a Bachelor's program. The Miami Gardens location was added in 2013.

Academics

CBT Technology Institute offers academic, technical, and vocational programs.  Some of these courses give the individual the ability to apply for professional certifications applicable for the area of training.

References

External links
 Official website

1988 establishments in Florida
Business schools in Florida
Colleges accredited by the Accrediting Council for Independent Colleges and Schools
Educational institutions established in 1988
Education in Hialeah, Florida
Education in Miami
For-profit universities and colleges in the United States
Private universities and colleges in Florida
Universities and colleges in Miami-Dade County, Florida
Universities and colleges in Miami metropolitan area